The Embassy Theatre (formerly the Emboyd Theatre) is a 2,471-seat performing arts theater in Fort Wayne, Indiana, USA. It was built in 1928 as a movie palace and today it is the home of the Fort Wayne Philharmonic Orchestra.

History
The theatre has been known by its current name since 1952. Attached to the Embassy Theatre to the west is the seven-story Indiana Hotel. The theatre features a 1,100-pipe Page theater organ, which was restored between 1976 and 1996. The Embassy was placed on the National Register of Historic Places in 1975, the year the theater was reopened as a performing arts center. Since its reopening, the theatre has primarily been used for concerts, Broadway shows, symphonies, family shows, and other events. The stage, which contains a red sequined velour main curtain, was expanded in 1995 to its current size of 44′7″ by 54 feet. The Indiana Hotel lobby and mezzanine were also restored at this time. A new marquee was added to the front façade in 2005 as well as curbside improvements.

References

External links
Official site

Theatres on the National Register of Historic Places in Indiana
Concert halls in Indiana
Theatres in Indiana
Music venues in Indiana
National Register of Historic Places in Fort Wayne, Indiana
Buildings and structures in Fort Wayne, Indiana
Culture of Fort Wayne, Indiana
Tourist attractions in Fort Wayne, Indiana
Public venues with a theatre organ
1928 establishments in Indiana
Theatres completed in 1928